Cin (or Cinköy) is a village in Tarsus  district of Mersin Province, Turkey. It is situated to the South of the Taurus Mountains and to the North of Turkish  motor way . The population of Cin  is 756 as of 2011. Grapes are the most important agricultural product of the village

References

Villages in Tarsus District